Dumgoyne is a hill prominent on the edge of the Campsie Fells and is a well-known landmark visible from Glasgow. The plug is readily reached from a path beside Glengoyne Distillery or via a water-board track from the contiguous villages of Strathblane and Blanefield  to the east or Killearn to the west.

From Strathblane-Blanefield, the path begins as Campsie Dene Road, which almost immediately becomes a private road after passing between the village's war memorial and the grounds of St. Kessog's Catholic Church. After passing several gates on the way, turn to the right where there is another gate. Follow this path up and around the side Dumfoyn, and from here the path steepens, as it goes up Dumgoyne. The summit is marked by a small standing stone erected some years ago by local Rotarians. This route to Dumgoyne passes close to the Spittal of Ballewan (545811) the former site of a medieval Knights Templar hospital.

Close to Dumgoyne is Dumfoyn (547825) a similar but less remarkable and much less climbed hill. From these hills the much smaller but heavily wooded Dumgoyach (531810) can be seen. Dumgoyach due to its association with the Edmonstons of Duntreath provides a historic link with Alice Keppel and Camilla, Queen Consort.

Hamlet
Dumgoyne is also the name of a nearby hamlet, a popular stop for people walking on the West Highland Way.

References

External links

Volcanic plugs of Scotland
Mountains and hills of Stirling (council area)